Lesosibirsk is a town in Krasnoyarsk Krai, Russia, located on the Yenisei River. Population: .

History

The village of Maklakov Lug, later known as Maklakovo existed on the territory of modern Lesosibirsk since 1640. In the early 20th century, Norwegian industrialist Jonas Lied established a wood processing plant here. The plant was nationalized after the revolution. After World War II, large wood-processing plants were built here. The Achinsk–Maklakovo railway connected the area with the Siberian Railway. Two new settlements, Novomaklakovo and Novoyeniseysk were built in the area. On February 21, 1975, the settlements of Maklakovo and Novomaklakovo were merged into the new town of Lesosibirsk. The settlement of Novoyeniseysk was merged into Lesosibirsk in 1989.

Geography

Location

Time

Climate

Lesosibirsk has a subarctic climate (Köppen climate classification Dfc). Lesosibirsk has high differentials between summer and winter temperatures.

Demographics

Administrative and municipal status
Within the framework of administrative divisions, it is, together with the urban-type settlement of Strelka and one rural locality (the settlement of Ust-Angarsk), incorporated as the krai town of Lesosibirsk—an administrative unit with the status equal to that of the districts. As a municipal division, the krai town of Lesosibirsk is incorporated as Lesosibirsk Urban Okrug.

References

Notes

Sources



Cities and towns in Krasnoyarsk Krai
Lesosibirsk Urban Okrug
Populated places on the Yenisei River